Margaret LeAnn Rimes Cibrian (born August 28, 1982) is an American singer, songwriter and actress. She originally rose to success as a country music artist at age 13 with 1996's "Blue". She has since crossed over into pop, contemporary Christian, and other musical genres. Rimes has placed over 40 singles on international charts since 1996. In addition, she has sold over 37 million records worldwide, with 20.8 million album sales in the United States according to Nielsen SoundScan. Billboard ranked her number 17 in terms of sales success in the 1990–2000 decade.

Rimes was raised in Texas and demonstrated a unique singing ability from a young age. Through her parents' efforts, Rimes began performing in various programs, including musical theater and local music contests. Developing a local following, Rimes recorded two studio albums as a preteen. These records helped bring her to the attention of Nashville label Curb Records. She signed a contract with Curb at age 13 and released 1996's "Blue". It became a top ten hit on the Billboard country songs chart. Her 1996 album of the same name sold over six million copies and established her as a major country artist. In 1997, Rimes crossed over into pop music with "How Do I Live". The song became one of the best-selling singles of the 1990s. An extended mix of the track was included on her next album You Light Up My Life: Inspirational Songs, which sold over four million copies. Over the next several years, Rimes's singles demonstrated further crossover success. These include "I Need You" and "Can't Fight the Moonlight".

Breaking away from her father's management in the 2000s, Rimes experimented with several styles. In 2002, she released the pop-inspired Twisted Angel and in 2004 released the Christmas record What a Wonderful World. She returned to her country origins with 2005's This Woman, which produced three country hits. A similar album project followed in 2007 titled Family. After appearing in the 2009 television film Northern Lights, Rimes began an affair with fellow actor Eddie Cibrian. The relationship received notable media attention over the next several years. Her 2013 album, Spitfire chronicled the affair and her personal difficulties from the experience.

Ending her long-time professional relationship with Curb Records, Rimes released a series of Christmas recordings over the next several years. This included 2014's One Christmas: Chapter 1 and 2015's Today Is Christmas. In 2016, she returned with the pop-flavored studio effort Remnants, which featured two Billboard dance club hits. Her most recent efforts include a 2020 album titled Chant: The Human & the Holy, which centers on personal mantras and chants inspired by Rimes's mental health journeys. Rimes further developed her acting career during this period. She has since appeared in several feature and television films including Good Intentions (2010), Reel Love (2011), and It's Christmas, Eve (2018). She also guest appeared in the Netflix series Country Comfort (2021) as herself.

Early life 
Rimes was born in Jackson, Mississippi. She is the only child of Wilbur Rimes and Belinda Butler. The family moved to Garland, Texas, when she was six. She was enrolled in vocal and dance classes, and was performing at local talent shows at the age of five. Rimes began her career in musical theatre, performing in a Dallas, Texas, production of A Christmas Carol, and almost landing the lead part in the Broadway production of Annie. After appearing on the network television competition show Star Search, where she clearly charmed host Ed McMahon in addition to being a one-week champion, Rimes decided to go into country music. Rimes appeared a number of times on Johnnie High's Country Music Revue in Arlington, Texas, which gained the attention of national talent scouts.

By age nine, Rimes was an experienced singer. She toured nationally with her father and also regularly performed a cappella renditions of "The Star-Spangled Banner" at the opening of the Dallas Cowboys football games. Wilbur Rimes began recording his daughter under the independent label Nor Va Jak when she turned 11. Her debut studio album was released on the label in 1991 entitled Everybody's Sweetheart. Rimes was then discovered by Dallas disc jockey and record promoter Bill Mack. Mack was impressed by Rimes's vocal ability, and over the following three years, he made various attempts to take Rimes to a mainstream level. The center of Mack's plan to bring her success was his composition, "Blue".  In July 1994, Rimes recorded the song on her second studio album, All That. Mack then arranged a recording contract for Rimes with Curb Records. She signed with the Nashville label in 1996.

Music career

1996: Country music breakthrough with Blue 

After signing with Curb Records, Rimes recorded a new version of "Blue" as a single. However, Rimes told a BBC radio program in October 2016 that the record company accidentally released the version she had recorded as an 11-year-old. She said it was this version that peaked at number ten on the Billboard Country Chart. Writers and critics drew comparisons to Rimes with that of Patsy Cline. Promotion for the single incorrectly stated that Rimes was the first person to record the song. The statement proved false as the song had been recorded by multiple artists over the years including Bill Mack himself. Nonetheless, the media attention to "Blue" further added to the belief that Rimes was the successor to Cline's legacy.

Rimes third album of the same name was also released in 1996. The disc sold 123,000 copies in its first week, the highest figure in SoundScan history at that time. It peaked at number one on the Top Country Albums and debuted at number three on the Billboard 200 albums chart, eventually selling a total of four million copies in the United States and eight million copies worldwide. AllMusic considered the album to be "delightful" and that it could "help inspire other young teens". Rimes followed up the single with "One Way Ticket (Because I Can)". The song became her first and only number one single on the Billboard Country Chart. A remake of Eddy Arnold's 1955 hit "The Cattle Call" was later released as a single as well. Blue would also spawn the charting single "Hurt Me" and the top five country song "The Light in Your Eyes".

With the album's success, Rimes received many major industry awards. In 1997 at 14 years old she became the youngest person to win a Grammy, for Best New Artist and Best Female Country Vocal Performance for "Blue". She was also the first Country music artist to win the Best New Artist category. The same year she won the Country Music Association's "Horizon Award" for Best New Artist Of The Year, becoming the youngest person to ever be nominated and win a Country Music Association award. She was nominated for similar awards from the Academy of Country Music.

1997–2004: Pop crossover and worldwide success 
In 1997, Rimes released a compilation of previously recorded material under the Nor Va Jak label, Unchained Melody: The Early Years. The album mainly consisted of remakes, ranging from Country to pop, including songs originally recorded by The Beatles, Whitney Houston, Bill Monroe, and Dolly Parton. Rimes's version of the title track became a major country hit in early 1997 and helped increase sales for the album. In June 1997, Rimes would appear on the Disney Channel for television special called LeAnn Rimes in Concert. In September 1997, Rimes released her follow-up studio album to Blue titled You Light Up My Life: Inspirational Songs. The album covered classic inspirational songs and several pop songs. The album was a departure from Rimes's previous releases as it contained more Adult Contemporary-styled music than Country. The album sold over four million copies in the United States, certifying 4× Multi-Platinum by the Recording Industry Association of America. The album contained an extended version of the single "How Do I Live", which became a major pop hit on the Billboard Hot 100, reaching number two. "How Do I Live" set a new record for becoming the longest-running single in Billboard Hot 100 history, spending 69 weeks on the chart. In later years, the song was ranked as the most successful song of the 1990s by Billboard magazine. 

Rimes released her third album in May 1998 titled Sittin' on Top of the World. The album leaned towards Adult Contemporary and mid-tempo pop music. It included pop material written by Carole Bayer Sager and David Foster. It also included a remake of Prince's "Purple Rain" and was produced by her father. The album was given mixed reviews. Allmusic gave the album two out of five stars. Rolling Stone stated that Rimes "holds her own in the more popular style of Mariah Carey and Celine Dion, wherein a spectacular voice upstages a song, grins and goes on about her business." Sittin' on Top of the World debuted at number two on the Top Country Albums chart, and number three on the Billboard 200, and sold over a million copies in the United States, certifying "Platinum" in sales by the RIAA. The project spawned the number four Billboard country hit "Commitment", the Top 20 Pop hit "Looking Through Your Eyes", and the number 10 country hit "Nothin' New Under the Moon".

In October 1999, Curb released Rimes's self-titled fourth studio album. The record was a collection of country music cover songs mainly by Patsy Cline. It included "Crazy", "I Fall to Pieces", and "She's Got You". These recordings were primarily taken from Cline's 12 Greatest Hits album. Rimes' album received mostly positive reviews. Allmusic called the song, "a return to her roots" and "a salute to one of her idols, Patsy Cline." The album in general received much praise. Allmusic called the album one of her "better" efforts, since they had disliked her previous releases. Entertainment Weekly gave the album a positive review and said that Rimes's voice, "dares listeners to take note of what is missing in her interpretations – the gutsiness and gut-wrenching urgency of performers who felt what they sang." The album debuted at number one on the Top Country Albums chart, topping the country albums chart for two weeks. It also peaked at number eight on the Billboard 200 albums chart. The album also sold over one million copies in the United States, and was certified "Platinum" in sales by the RIAA. The project also included the new song "Big Deal". Released as the lead single, "Big Deal" reached number six on the Billboard country chart. Also in 1999, Rimes recorded a duet with Elton John for the stage musical Aida, titled "Written in the Stars".

In 2000, Rimes contributed to the soundtrack from the 1999 TV movie Jesus. The song, "I Need You", was issued as the lead single from the soundtrack in July 2000. A country mix was released as a single to radio along with a pop version. "I Need You" was characterized by Allmusic as having similarities to that of Adult Contemporary and Pop music. The song reached number eight on the Billboard country songs chart and number 11 on the Hot 100. Rimes would then make an appearance in the 2000 film Coyote Ugly and contribute four songs to the soundtrack. "Can't Fight the Moonlight" was released as a single from the film, reaching number 11 on the Hot 100. By February 2002 "Can't Fight the Moonlight" had become a crossover pop hit, reaching number 11 in United States and becoming the highest selling single of 2001 in Australia. "Can't Fight the Moonlight" won Rimes a Blockbuster Entertainment Award for "Favorite Song from a Movie". Also issued from the soundtrack was "But I Do Love You", which reached the American country top 20.

In January 2001, Curb Records released another compilation of previously recorded material, I Need You. The album received mostly unfavorable reviews. Rolling Stone gave the album two and a half stars, describing it as "synthetic-feeling". Despite very little praise from critics, the album sold well, and was certified "Gold" in sales by the RIAA. Rimes would later go on to publicly disown the album, which she stated was compiled from studio outtakes her father had produced and that it was released without her knowledge or input. At the time, during the litigation with her label Curb, Rimes was asking that Curb give her the rights to all past recordings and videos, give up all publishing interests in her compositions, and destroy all currently available recordings. In 2002, she released her fifth studio effort Twisted Angel, which contained more adult material. It was certified "Gold" by the RIAA, her second Gold-certified album. Rolling Stone gave the album two out of five stars, stating that the album sounded too "country-pop crossover". The following year when Rimes turned 21, she released her first children's book, titled Jag, in July and she also released a Greatest Hits compilation in November.

2005–2013: Return to country 
In January 2005, Rimes's ninth studio album This Woman was released. The disc's songwriting and production was a return to her country origins. "It's mainly a Country album, but it's my kind of Country music," she told the Voice of America. It was Rimes's best-selling album in over five years, reaching the top five of both the Billboard Country Albums chart and the Billboard 200.
The album spawned the singles "Nothin' 'Bout Love Makes Sense", "Probably Wouldn't Be This Way", and "Something's Gotta Give". All three songs reached the top five of the Billboard country songs chart, becoming her highest-charting singles in over five years. In summer 2006, Rimes released the studio album Whatever We Wanna. Due to the increased success of This Woman in North America, it was sold exclusively to European audiences. In the United Kingdom, the album reached number 15.

In October 2007, Asylum-Curb issued Rimes's eleventh studio disc titled Family. The country-flavored project as the first album in her career in which every track featured writing credits from Rimes herself. Rolling Stone called the record "uneven" and gave it a rating of three and half stars. Allmusic gave Family four stars and said that it "illustrates her range as a singer along with some true strength as a writer."
The project's lead single "Nothin' Better to Do" reached the top 20 of the Billboard country songs chart while the second single, "Good Friend and a Glass of Wine", reached the top 40. In 2008, Rimes joined Kenny Chesney on his Poets and Pirates Tour, along with Brooks & Dunn, Keith Urban, Sammy Hagar, Gary Allan, Big & Rich, and Luke Bryan. Around the same time, she collaborated with Joss Stone for a CMT Crossroads special aired in fall 2007. In 2009, Rimes published What I Cannot Change along with song co-writer, Darrell Brown. It was released on April 14, 2009, and contains a bonus CD with an exclusive live performance of the song and both Brown and Rimes reading excerpts from the book.

In 2011, Rimes released her twelfth studio collection called Lady & Gentlemen. Co-produced by Vince Gill, the disc contained a set of classic country songs originally made successful by male artists that Rimes re-recorded from a female perspective. It also featured production credits from Rimes herself, becoming her first album that she produced. Included on the project were songs by John Conlee, George Jones and Merle Haggard. AllMusic's Stephen Thomas Erlewine commented, "As concept albums go, LeAnn Rimes’ 2011 album Lady & Gentlemen is a good one: a collection of masculine country classics reinterpreted by a female singer. Entertainment Weeklys Mikael Wood concluded that "The result is predictably solid, though it rarely sheds new light on the top-shelf material." The album's cover of John Anderson's "Swingin'" was nominated for a Grammy award. Lady & Gentlemen also featured two bonus tracks that were original recordings: "Crazy Women" and "Give". Both tracks were released as singles and reached charting positions on the Billboard country survey.

Over the next several years, Rimes went into the studio to record songs for her next project. In 2013, Spitfire was released and marked her final album with the Curb label. It was co-produced by Rimes, along with Darrell Brown. The disc centered around Rimes's affair with future husband Eddie Cibrian and the media speculation around their relationship. "I used to get mad at the tabloids, but I should be thanking them because they helped me write this whole record," she commented. The album sold 10,798 copies in its first week and debuted at number 36 on the Billboard 200. It also debuted at number nine on the country albums chart. The official first single to be released from Spitfire, "What Have I Done", was released to digital download originally in 2012, but was replaced by the second single, "Borrowed", also issued in 2012 for radio release. Sales of the album were considered "disappointing" by several news outlets, including US Weekly while singles released from the album failed to become commercially-successful.

2014–present: Changes in musical style and new directions

In 2014, Rimes announced that she would release three Christmas EPs over the course of three years: 2014, 2015 and 2016. In October 2014, the first of these planned EP's was released entitled One Christmas: Chapter 1. It was issued through Iconic Entertainment and contained six holiday cover tunes. This included the lead single, a cover of "I Want a Hippopotamus for Christmas". It peaked at number 20 on the Top Country Albums chart and number 35 on the Top Holiday Albums list. Rimes later embarked on a holiday tour to promote the project titled the "One Christmas Tour", which played multiple shows around the United States in the winter months of 2014. Rimes's original plan of multiple EP releases was dropped and replaced with a full-length holiday album in 2015. That year, she released Today Is Christmas through Prodigy Entertainment. The 12-track holiday record contained a mixture of cover tunes and original songs, including the title track. This included was a duet of "Celebrate Me Home" with Gavin DeGraw. The record reached number two on the Holiday albums chart and number nine on the Country Albums chart.

In 2016, Rimes signed with RCA UK and released a cover of Brandi Carlile's "The Story". It was included on her fifteenth studio album titled Remnants, which was also issued on RCA. First issued in the United Kingdom in 2016, Remnants was later released in the United States in February 2017. The disc reached number 15 on the UK Albums Chart and number 88 on the Billboard 200. The record received mixed reviews. AllMusic concluded that "She may be able to sing just about anything but the album would've been stronger if it had a greater connective thread than sheer skill." Meanwhile, Matt Bjorke of Roughstock wrote, "With these 14 fantastic songs, Remnants is easily an early contender for my album of the year." The album would also spawn the singles "Long Live Love" and "Love Is Love Is Love". Both recordings topped the Billboard Dance Club Songs, becoming her second and third number one Dance hits.

In June 2018, Rimes released Re-Imagined through EverLe Records and the Thirty Tigers label. The EP contained five tracks from her back-catalogue that she re-recorded ("Can't Fight the Moonlight", "Blue", "One Way Ticket", "How Do I Live" and "Borrowed"). The new recording of "Borrowed" featured duet vocals from Stevie Nicks. Later in 2018, Rimes appeared in the Hallmark original television film titled It's Christmas, Eve. She recorded the film's soundtrack of the same name, which was released in October 2018. Included were covers of Christmas standards, as well as new recordings she composed with producer Darrell Brown. In 2019, Rimes recorded and released her first live album titled Rimes: Live at Gruene Hall. A mixture of country, pop and rock covers were featured and were all recorded at Gruene Hall, a venue located in Texas.

In November 2020, Rimes released her seventeenth studio record Chant: The Human & the Holy. The project was a change in musical directions, as its 12 tracks were built from chants and daily mantras rather than traditional songs. A corresponding health and wellness podcast titled Wholly Human followed around the same time that focused on similar themes. Rimes produced and composed the album with longtime musical collaborator Darrell Brown. "As I started meditating I started chanting and singing. And as I felt what was coming through needed to come through and felt good, I would press record on my phone and get it down, then expand it from there," Rimes explained of the projects.

Rimes announced that she will release a new studio album on September 16, 2022 entitled God's Work.

Acting career
1997–2007: Move to Los Angeles and early acting roles
In 1997, Rimes's parents divorced. While her father stayed in Nashville, Rimes chose to move to Los Angeles with her mother. In Los Angeles, Rimes started an acting career at age 16. The same year, Rimes starred in the ABC television film Holiday in Your Heart. The film was based on Rimes's book of the same name, which was also released in 1997. The film was the start of three-movie contract that Rimes was offered by ABC in 1998. The film was partially semi-autobiographical, with Rimes playing a country performer who discovers that her grandmother becomes hospitalized. In the film, Rimes also performed several of her hits including "Blue" and "One Way Ticket (Because I Can)". In 1998, she played a teen runaway in one episode of Days of Our Lives. "My grandmother used to ... I used to want to watch Sesame Street and she would make me watch Days of Our Lives and so I got hooked on it. I watch Days all the time," Rimes explained.

In 2000, Rimes not only contributed to the soundtrack of Coyote Ugly, but also appeared in the film itself. Rimes only appeared at the end of the movie, dancing on top of a bar alongside actresses Tyra Banks and Piper Perabo. "I was trying to be this sexy singer performing on a bar, and that was so opposite of me. I was really acting at the time 'cause I was still figuring all that out about myself," she told Entertainment Tonight. In addition, Rimes provided the singing voice for Piper Perabo's character Violet Sanford.

In 2005, Rimes became the host of the USA Network talent competition Nashville Star. The show was broadcast from the BellSouth Acuff Theater in Nashville. However, a vocal chord illness stopped Rimes from maintaining hosting duties. In 2006, Rimes sang the theme song to the Holly Hobbie & Friends series of animated specials. She also guest starred in the series' Christmas episode. In 2007, Rimes contributed to the soundtrack of Evan Almighty. For the film, she contributed the song "Ready For A Miracle" (previously recorded by Patti LaBelle). The song can be heard in the movie, during the end credits, and in the trailers of Evan Almighty.

2009–present: Television film transition
In 2009, Rimes played the role of Meg Galloway in the made-for-television film Northern Lights. The show was aired on the Lifetime network. The film was based on Nora Roberts's book of the same name. At the time of the film's announcement, it was reported that Rimes's character would have love scenes with a fellow male actor. "I definitely will be making out with someone...I think I know who but I can't say yet," she told The Boot in 2008. It was later announced the Eddie Cibrian would be playing her love interest. Rumors of their real-life affair helped make Northern Lights the network's most-watched television movie, with four and a half million viewers in March 2009.

Rimes played a supporting role in the movie Good Intentions with Elaine Hendrix, which filmed near Atlanta, Georgia. "I've been wanting to act...It’s just been finding the right thing. And Good Intentions was the right thing at the right time. It was the right script," she told Sounds Like Nashville. Rimes also contributed to the film's soundtrack. In 2011, she played a guest role in the television show Drop Dead Diva, starring as the ex-wife of fictional celebrity. In 2011, Rimes played the role of an attorney who returns to her hometown in the television film Reel Love. The film aired on Country Music Television and also starred actor Burt Reynolds. In 2013, she appeared on the FX television show Anger Management alongside Charlie Sheen. In 2014, Rimes starred in the reality television series LeAnn & Eddie alongside Eddie Cibrian. The program aired on the VH1 network. The intention of the reality show was to "help clear the air" about their romantic relationship. "This show gave us an opportunity to take back our lives in a way and show a different side of us than what people really believe," Rimes commented. After one season, the show was cancelled by VH1.

In 2017, Rimes made a cameo appearance in the film Logan Lucky where she sang "America the Beautiful". One year later, Rimes starred as the main character in the Hallmark Channel's television film It's Christmas, Eve. Rimes played the fictional character Eve Morgan who is a high school superintendent who helps saves the district's music program. In 2020, Rimes competed as the "Sun" on the fourth season of the Fox reality singing competition The Masked Singer. Her identity was revealed during the season finale on December 16, 2020, where she was declared the winner of the season. She was later a guest panelist in the season five finale. Darius Rucker also joined her in the show.

Rimes celebrated her 25th year in the music industry with a special CMT Crossroads episode featuring Carly Pearce, Brandy Clark, Ashley McBryde and Mickey Guyton airing on April 14, 2022.

Artistry
Voice and vocal ability
Rimes's voice has been described as a soprano. She has often been described by critics as having "powerhouse vocals". Critics took notice from her earliest recordings. Entertainment Weekly'''s Don McLeese commented, "Though 'Young Country' doesn’t get much younger than Rimes, she already shows more poise and maturity than many artists twice her age." In similar vein, The Washington Post wrote in 2005 "Rimes's voice is far and away her strongest selling point. Rich and worldly, it belied her young age -- especially when she tackled a vintage-sounding country song like 'Blue'." From a young age, Rimes also chose material that was considered beyond her years. In her first album, Rimes recorded such material as Deborah Allen's "My Baby", whose lyrics say, "my baby is a full-time lover, my baby is a full-grown man." Other material such as Diane Warren's "How Do I Live" had also been considered too mature for Rimes's age and was the main reason why her version of the song was not chosen to be used in the soundtrack for the film Con Air.

As Rimes matured into adulthood, critics continued to take notice of her voice. In reviewing a 2005 concert, Chrissie Dickinson of The Chicago Tribune found that while her stage presence was lacking, Rimes's voice had significant power: "But what Rimes lacked in stage electricity she made up for in vocal power. She has superlative control over that big voice, a soaring instrument that can belt and whisper within the same song." In reviewing her 2011 album Lady & Gentlemen Stephen Thomas Erlewine stated, "Throughout it all, Rimes hits her marks with ease...she’s become a stronger, more nuanced singer over the years." Jessica Goodman of Glamour found that her 2016 song "Remnants" "showcases the powerhouse vocals that made Rimes famous all those years ago."

Influences
Rimes has credited performers of different musical styles as career influences, including Alanis Morissette,<ref>{{cite news |last1=Williams |first1=Melissa |title=COUNTRY STARLET'S TALENT FAR EXCEEDS HER YEARS\ FOURTEEN-YEAR-OLD LEANN RIMES BREAKS THROUGH WITH BLUE' |url=https://greensboro.com/country-starlets-talent-far-exceeds-her-years-fourteen-year-old-leann-rimes-breaks-through-with/article_02006643-54fa-5776-bab0-bd269186963c.html |access-date=December 21, 2021 |work=News & Record |date=October 9, 1996}}</ref> Reba McEntire, Wynonna Judd, Judy Garland, Barbra Streisand and Whitney Houston. Early in her career, Rimes commented on McEntire's influence with The New York Times: "If I had to model my career after anyone it would have to be Reba. She's made some great business decisions in her career to stay around for 20 years, and my biggest goal right now is to stay around for a long time."

Rimes was most notably influenced by Patsy Cline. Listeners and critics drew similarities to Cline's voice through Rimes's phrasing and vocal delivery Rimes later stated that Cline's voice largely influenced the way she created her own unique sound. "[Patsy Cline] was such a huge part of how I created my sound. From [Cline], really it was about this true, honest, emotional connection and the way that she could just take you to a place that you don't normally go within yourself when you listened to her music," she told popculture. In 2013, Rimes performed a tribute to Cline at the American Country Awards she sang a tribute medley of Cline's songs. "I mean I know how much I've been influenced by her and how I feel about her and then you see a sea of people and artists who have been just as influenced and she's touched so many people," she told E!.

Musical styles
Rimes has been categorized in the musical genres of country, pop, Contemporary Christian, adult contemporary and dance pop. Rimes began her career rooted in the country genre with debut Curb release, "Blue" and its subsequent country chart hits. After crossing over with songs like "How Do I Live" and "Can't Fight the Moonlight", Rimes was then described as a pop artist. Further releases like Sittin' on Top of the World demonstrated a more adult contemporary style. Stephen Thomas Erlewine of AllMusic found that while she dabbled in many styles, Rimes was tied to the country genre: " During the decade that separated "Can't Fight the Moonlight" and Remnants, Rimes dabbled in pop, but she remained anchored in country music, regularly placing on Billboard's Country Top 40 and occasionally landing a big hit."

Personal life
Marriages and relationships

In 1998, Rimes dated actor Andrew Keegan. When they first met, Rimes was 15 and Keegan was 19. The couple dated when Rimes and her father were involved in a lawsuit. In the same lawsuit, Rimes's father claimed that Keegan was attempting to "get his hands" on Rimes's finances. The relationship ended in 2001. According to press reports, Keegan became romantically interested in Rimes's co-star in Coyote Ugly (Piper Perabo).

Shortly after the couple parted ways, Rimes met dancer Dean Sheremet at the 2001 Academy of Country Music Awards. By December 2001, the pair became engaged. In 2002 and at age 19, Rimes wed Sheremet in a church ceremony in Dallas, Texas. In 2003, the couple purchased a 1.7 million dollar home, located in Nashville, Tennessee. In 2007, Sheremet directed the choreography for Rimes's single "Nothin' Better to Do". According to People, the couple spent more time apart in later years of their marriage as Rimes devoted energy towards an acting career in Los Angeles while Sheremet remained in Nashville. In July 2009, the couple separated and in September 2009, Rimes announced their plans to divorce. The divorce was finalized on June 19, 2010, exactly six months after Sheremet filed divorce documents for dissolution of marriage.

Rimes began an extramarital affair with actor Eddie Cibrian, whom she worked with on the TV film Northern Lights Reports surfaced in March 2009 of the couple embracing while eating at a restaurant. Brandi Glanville, Cibrian's wife at the time and the mother of his two sons, filed for divorce as a result of the affair in August 2009, ending eight years of marriage. In June 2010, Rimes spoke for the first time about the end of her first marriage, stating; "I take responsibility for everything I've done. I hate that people got hurt, but I don't regret the outcome." In June 2010, Rimes moved into Cibrian's California home. In an interview with ABC, Rimes discussed her new relationship: "What happened is not who I am, period. But I do know how much I love him. So I've always said I don't live my life with regret. I can't." In December 2010, it was announced via Billboard that Rimes and Cibrian were engaged. Rimes and Cibrian wed on April 22, 2011, at a private home in California. The 40-person ceremony also included Cibrian's sons from his first marriage. In 2013, the couple bought a home in Hidden Hills, California, listed for three million dollars.

Family challenges and lawsuits
From the beginning of Rimes' career, father Wilbur Rimes managed his daughter and served as producer on her records. In May 2000, Rimes and her mother sued Wilbur, alleging that he took more than seven million dollars of her income over the course of five years. The lawsuit claimed that money was being taken away from Rimes personally as well as from a management company that was founded back in 1995. The suit also included her former manager, Lyle Walker, who assisted her father in management duties. The suit was filed in a district court in Dallas, Texas. Rimes also alleged that both men made unreasonable fees and took advantage of Rimes's label (Curb Records). Rimes sought unspecified damages because her attorney was not sure of how much money had been lost in the preceding five years. In May 2001, she was informed by a Nashville court that she could not break her contract with Curb Records. Amidst the reaction, she visibly mouthed the words, "I hate you" to her father. When Rimes was 18, she filed a lawsuit against Curb Records on her own, successfully petitioning a court to remove her position as a "minority" on the recording contract. As a result, this change made the contract binding.

In 2002, Rimes's lawsuit with her father was "settled on undisclosed terms." "It is difficult to express just how happy I am that all of the legal troubles between my daughter and I are over," Rimes's father commented. Rimes reconciled with her father for her wedding. During her wedding ceremony to Dean Sheremet, Wilbur Rimes walked his daughter down the aisle. "I've never hated my dad. I just wanted a dad. I guess I just really disliked where he was in my life. I just wanted him to be my father," she told ABC News.

Health challenges
In 2008, she opened up about her lifelong struggle with the autoimmune disease psoriasis. She participated in a PSA to raise awareness about the disease.  In August 2012, one day after her birthday, Rimes checked into treatment for anxiety and stress. "This is just a time for me to emotionally check out for a second and take care of myself and come back in 30 days as the best 30-year-old woman I can be," she explained. In March 2014, Rimes's jaw became dislocated while performing, ending her concert encore early. Rimes attributed the dislocation to temporomandibular joint dysfunction, a disorder of the jaw joint and surrounding muscles. She has publicly posted about her struggles with this disorder via Twitter. In 2020, following a stress-related flare up of psoriasis, Rimes posed for a nude photo shoot for Glamour magazine as part of her efforts to raise awareness and acceptance about the disease on 2020 World Psoriasis Day (observed October 29). Later that year, she told People magazine that in addition to anxiety and stress, she was also suffering from depression in 2010: "It's something I've been very vocal about, because I feel like there's so much stigma around it."

Philanthropy
Rimes lent her voice to the 2008 song "Just Stand Up". The proceeds benefited Stand Up to Cancer. As a result of SU2C fundraising endeavors, the SU2C scientific advisory committee, overseen by the American Association for Cancer Research, was able to award $73.6 million towards cancer research. In 2009, Rimes was given a special humanitarian award from the Academy of Country Music in honor of her philanthropic efforts. In December 2010, she performed "The Rose", joined by The Gay Men's Chorus of Los Angeles in remembrance of the many gay teenagers who committed suicide in 2010. On her weblog she wrote on June 18, 2011: "I believe in equality for everyone. I believe everyone should have the right to love and commit to whomever they want. [...] All I know is that in God's eyes we are all the same. I just wish we could see through the eyes of God more often." In 2017, Rimes revealed that her uncle was gay and died from the AIDS virus. "Now, every time, everywhere I get to sing — or when I get stand up alongside my LGBTQ brothers and sisters — I get to give him a voice," she commented.

 Discography Studio albums'''
 Everybody's Sweetheart (1991)
 All That (1994)
 Blue (1996)
 You Light Up My Life: Inspirational Songs (1997)
 Sittin' on Top of the World (1998)
 LeAnn Rimes (1999)
 I Need You (2001)
 Twisted Angel (2002)
 What a Wonderful World (2004)
 This Woman (2005)
 Whatever We Wanna (2006)
 Family (2007)
 Lady & Gentlemen (2011)
 Spitfire (2013)
 Today Is Christmas (2015)
 Remnants (2016)
 Chant: The Human & the Holy (2020)
 God's Work (2022)

 Filmography 

 Holiday in Your Heart (1997)
 Days of Our Lives (1998)
 Moesha (1999)
 Coyote Ugly (2000)
 American Dreams (2003)
 Holly Hobbie and Friends: Christmas Wishes (2006)
 Northern Lights (2009)
 Good Intentions (2010)
 Drop Dead Diva (2011)
 Anger Management (2013)
 It's Christmas, Eve (2018)
 Country Comfort (2021)

 Awards and nominations 

Rimes has won several awards for her work as a music artist. This includes three accolades from the Academy of Country Music and two accolades from the Grammy Awards.

 Books 
 Holiday in Your Heart (1997) with Tom Carter
 Jag (2003)
 Jag's New Friend (2004)
 What I Cannot Change'' (2009) with Darrell Brown

References

External links 

 
 Official website

 
20th-century American actresses
20th-century American singers
20th-century American women singers
21st-century American actresses
21st-century American singers
21st-century American women singers
1982 births
Actresses from Mississippi
Actresses from Texas
American child singers
American country singer-songwriters
American women country singers
American women pop singers
American women singer-songwriters
American sopranos
APRA Award winners
Child pop musicians
Country musicians from Mississippi
Country musicians from Texas
Country pop musicians
Curb Records artists
Grammy Award winners
American LGBT rights activists
Living people
Musicians from Jackson, Mississippi
People from Garland, Texas
People from Hidden Hills, California
RCA Records artists
Singer-songwriters from Mississippi
Ballad musicians
Singer-songwriters from Texas
Singer-songwriters from California
Masked Singer winners